Syllepte elphegalis is a moth in the family Crambidae. It was described by Schaus in 1927. It is found in the Philippines (Luzon).

References

Moths described in 1927
elphegalis
Moths of Asia